Rebels may refer to:

 Participants in a rebellion
 Rebel groups, people who refuse obedience or order
 Rebels (American Revolution), patriots who rejected British rule in 1776

Film and television
 Rebels (film) or Rebelles, a 2019 French comedy film
 Rebelové, a 2001 Czech musical film
 "Rebels" (Law & Order episode), a 1995 episode of the TV series Law & Order
 Rebel Alliance, a fictional group of heroes from Star Wars
 Star Wars Rebels, a CGI animated television series

Music
 Rebels (album), a 2006 studio album by RBD
 Rebels (EP), a 2011 EP by Black Veil Brides
 "Rebels" (song), a 1985 song by Tom Petty and the Heartbreakers

Sports
 Melbourne Rebels, an Australian rugby union team
 Ole Miss Rebels, the sports team name of the University of Mississippi  
 UNLV Rebels, the sports team name of the University of Nevada, Las Vegas
 REBELS (kickboxing), defunct Japanese martial arts brand

Other uses
 Rebels Motorcycle Club, an outlaw motorcycle club in Australia

See also
 
 Rebel (disambiguation)
 The Rebels (disambiguation)